Wielkopolski Bank Kredytowy SA (Greater Poland Credit Bank) was a Poland-based commercial bank, which offered the normal range of retail and commercial financial services through its branch network. In 2001, Allied Irish Banks, its owners, merged it with Bank Zachodni to form BZ-WBK (which changed its name to Santander Bank Polska in 2018).

References

Allied Irish Banks
Banks of Poland
Banks established in 1989
2001 disestablishments in Poland
2001 mergers and acquisitions
Polish companies established in 1989